Nycole Raysla Silva Sobrinho (born 26 March 2000) is a Brazilian professional footballer who plays as a forward for Portuguese club SL Benfica and the Brazil women's national team.

Club career
On 6 August 2019, it was announced that Nycole Raysla would be joining Portuguese club Benfica, signing a two-year contract. After scoring 22 goals in 30 games for Benfica, her contract was extended until 2026.

International career
Nycole Raysla made her debut for the Brazil national team on 28 November 2020 against Ecuador, coming on as a substitute for Ludmila da Silva.

Honours
Benfica
Campeonato Nacional Feminino: 2020–21
 Taça da Liga: 2019–20, 2020–21
 Supertaça de Portugal: 2019

References

2000 births
Living people
Women's association football forwards
Brazilian women's footballers
Brazil women's international footballers
Footballers from Brasília
S.L. Benfica (women) footballers
Campeonato Nacional de Futebol Feminino players
Brazilian expatriate sportspeople in Portugal
Expatriate women's footballers in Portugal
Campeonato Brasileiro de Futebol Feminino Série A1 players